Discworld is a comic fantasy book series written by the English author Terry Pratchett, set on the Discworld, a flat planet balanced on the backs of four elephants which in turn stand on the back of a giant turtle. The series began in 1983 with The Colour of Magic and continued until the final novel The Shepherd's Crown, which was published in 2015, following Pratchett's death. The books frequently parody or take inspiration from classic works, usually fantasy or science fiction, as well as mythology, folklore and fairy tales, and often use them for satirical parallels with cultural, political and scientific issues.

Forty-one Discworld novels were published. Apart from the first novel in the series, The Colour of Magic, the original British editions of the first 26 novels, up to Thief of Time (2001), had cover art by Josh Kirby. After Kirby's death in 2001, the covers were designed by Paul Kidby. The American editions, published by HarperCollins, used their own cover art. Companion publications include eleven short stories (some only loosely related to the Discworld), four popular science books, and a number of supplementary books and reference guides. The series has been adapted for graphic novels, theatre, computer and board games, and television.

Discworld books regularly topped Sunday Times best-sellers list, making Pratchett the UK's best-selling author in the 1990s. Discworld novels have also won awards such as the Prometheus Award and the Carnegie Medal. In the BBC's Big Read, four Discworld novels were in the top 100, and a total of fourteen in the top 200. More than 80 million Discworld books have been sold in 37 languages.

Composition 
Very few of the Discworld novels have chapter divisions. Instead, they feature interweaving storylines. Pratchett was quoted as saying that he "just never got into the habit of chapters", later adding that "I have to shove them in the putative YA books because my editor screams until I do". However, the first Discworld novel The Colour of Magic was divided into "books", as is Pyramids. Additionally, Going Postal and Making Money both have chapters, a prologue, an epilogue, and brief teasers of what is to come in each chapter, in the style of A. A. Milne, Jules Verne, and Jerome K. Jerome.

Themes and motifs 
The Discworld novels contain common themes and motifs that run through the series. Fantasy clichés are parodied in many of the novels, as are various subgenres of fantasy, such as fairy tales (notably Witches Abroad), witch and vampire stories (Carpe Jugulum) and so on. Analogies of real-world issues, such as religion (Small Gods), fundamentalism and inner city tension (Thud), business and politics (Making Money), racial prejudice and exploitation (Snuff) are recurring themes, as are aspects of culture and entertainment, such as opera (Maskerade), rock music (Soul Music), cinema (Moving Pictures), and football (Unseen Academicals). Parodies of non-Discworld fiction also occur frequently, including Shakespeare, Beatrix Potter, and several movies. Major historical events, especially battles, are sometimes used as the basis for both trivial and key events in Discworld stories (Jingo, Eric, Pyramids), as are trends in science, technology, pop culture and modern art (Moving Pictures, Men at Arms, Thud). There are also humanist themes in many of the Discworld novels, and a focus on critical thinking skills in the Witches and Tiffany Aching series.

Storylines 

The Discworld novels and stories are, in principle, stand-alone works. However, a number of novels and stories form novel sequences with distinct story arcs:

Rincewind 

Rincewind was the first protagonist of Discworld. He is a wizard with no skill, no wizardly qualifications, and no interest in heroics. He is extremely cowardly but is constantly thrust into dangerous adventures. He saves Discworld on several occasions, and has an instrumental role in the emergence of life on Roundworld (Science of Discworld).

Other characters in the Rincewind story arc include Cohen the Barbarian, an aging hero of the old fantasy tradition, out of touch with the modern world and still fighting despite his advanced age; Twoflower, a naive tourist from the Agatean Empire (inspired by cultures of the Far East, particularly Japan and China); and The Luggage, a magical, semi-sentient and aggressive multi-legged travelling accessory. Rincewind appears in eight Discworld novels as well as the four Science of Discworld supplementary books.

Death 

Death appears in every novel except The Wee Free Men and Snuff, although sometimes with only a few lines. He is a seven-foot-tall skeleton in a black robe who sits astride a pale horse (called Binky). His dialogue is always depicted in small caps, and without quotation marks, as several characters state that Death's voice seems to arrive in their heads without actually passing through their ears as sound.

Death has the job of guiding souls onward from this world into the next. Over millennia in the role, he has developed a fascination with humanity to a point where he feels protective of it against outside forces. This fascination with humanity led to him adopting a daughter and taking on an apprentice (detailed in Mort) and eventually to their daughter Susan Sto Helit, who becomes a main character in books such as Soul Music, Hogfather, and Thief of Time.

Characters that often appear with Death include his butler Albert; his granddaughter Susan Sto Helit; the Death of Rats, the part of Death in charge of gathering the souls of rodents; Quoth, a talking raven (a parody of Edgar Allan Poe's "The Raven", although it refuses to say "Nevermore"); and the Auditors of Reality, personifications of the orderly physical laws and the closest thing Death has to a nemesis. Death or Susan appear as the main characters in five Discworld novels. He also appears in the short stories Death and What Comes Next, Theatre of Cruelty and Turntables of the Night.

Witches 

Witches in Pratchett's universe are largely stripped of their modern occultist associations (though Pratchett does frequently use his stories to lampoon such conceptions of witchcraft), and act as herbalists, nurses, adjudicators and wise women. Witches on the Disc can use magic, but generally prefer not to, finding simple but cunningly applied psychology (called "headology") far more effective.

The principal witch in the series is Granny Weatherwax, a taciturn, bitter old crone, from the small mountain country of Lancre. She largely despises people but takes on the role of their healer and protector because no one else can do the job as well as she can. Her closest friend is Nanny Ogg, a jolly, personable witch with the "common touch" who enjoys a smoke and a pint of beer, often leading to her singing bawdy folk songs including the notorious "Hedgehog Song". The two take on apprentice witches, initially Magrat Garlick, then Agnes Nitt, and then Tiffany Aching, who in turn go on to become accomplished witches in their own right.

Other characters in the Witches series include: King Verence II of Lancre, a onetime Fool; Jason Ogg, Nanny Ogg's eldest son and local blacksmith; Shawn Ogg, Nanny's youngest son who serves as his country's entire army and civil service; and Nanny's murderous cat Greebo. The witches have appeared in numerous Discworld books, and have featured as protagonists in seven. They have also appeared in the short story "The Sea and Little Fishes". Their stories frequently draw on ancient European folklore and fairy tales, as well as parodying famous works of literature, particularly by Shakespeare.

City Watch 

The stories featuring the Ankh-Morpork City Watch are urban fantasy, and frequently show the clashes that result when a traditional, magically run fantasy world such as the Disc comes into contact with modern technology and civilization. They revolve around the growth of the Ankh-Morpork City Watch from a hopeless gang of three to a fully equipped and efficient police force. The stories are largely police procedurals, featuring crimes that have heavy political or societal overtones.

The main character is Sam Vimes, a haggard, cynical, working-class street copper who, when introduced in Guards! Guards!, is the alcoholic Captain of the three-person Night Watch: lazy, cowardly, and none-too-bright Sergeant Fred Colon, and Corporal Nobby Nobbs, a petty thief in his own right. Then Carrot Ironfoundersson, a 6-foot-6-inch-tall (1.98 m) dwarf-by-adoption, comes down from the mountains to join the Watch and do real policing.

Other main characters include Angua, a werewolf; Detritus, a troll; Reg Shoe, a zombie and Dead Rights campaigner; Cuddy, a Dwarf who appears in Men at Arms; Golem Constable Dorfl; Cheery Littlebottom, the Watch's forensics expert, who is one of the first dwarves to be openly female (and who tried to rename herself "Cheri", but without success); Sam's wife, Lady Sybil Vimes (née Ramkin); Constable Visit-the-infidel-with-explanatory-pamphlets; Inspector A E Pessimal, recruited by Vimes as his adjutant when sent as an auditor by Havelock Vetinari, the Patrician of Ankh-Morpork. The City Watch have starred in eight Discworld stories, and have cameoed in a number of others, including Making Money, the children's book Where's My Cow?, and the short story "Theatre of Cruelty".

Pratchett stated on numerous occasions that the presence of the City Watch makes Ankh-Morpork stories "problematic", as stories set in the city that do not directly involve Vimes and the Watch often require a Watch presence to maintain the story—at which point, it becomes a Watch story by default.

Wizards 

The Wizards of the Unseen University (UU) have represented a strong thread through many of the Discworld novels, although the only books that they star in exclusively are The Science of the Discworld series and the novels Unseen Academicals and The Last Continent. In the early books, the faculty of UU changed frequently, as rising to the top usually involved assassination. However, with the ascension of the bombastic Mustrum Ridcully to the position of Archchancellor, the hierarchy has settled and characters have been given the chance to develop. The earlier books featuring the wizards also frequently dealt with the possible invasion of the Discworld by the creatures from the Dungeon Dimensions, Lovecraftian monsters that hunger for the magic and potential of the Discworld.

The wizards of UU employ the traditional "whizz-bang" type of magic seen in Dungeons & Dragons games, but also investigate the rules and structure of magic in terms highly reminiscent of particle physics. Prominent members include Ponder Stibbons, a geeky young wizard; Hex, the Disc's first computer/semi-sentient thinking engine; the Librarian, who was turned into an orangutan by magical accident, and who (sometimes violently) refuses to be turned back into a human; the Dean; the mentally unstable Bursar; the Chair of Indefinite Studies; the Lecturer in Recent Runes; and the Senior Wrangler. In later novels, Rincewind also joins their group, while the Dean leaves to become the Archchancellor of Brazeneck College in the nearby city of Pseudopolis.

The Wizards have featured prominently in nine Discworld books as well as starred in The Science of Discworld series and the short story "A Collegiate Casting-Out of Devilish Devices".

Tiffany Aching 

Tiffany Aching is a young apprentice witch in a series of Discworld books aimed at young adults. Her stories often parallel mythic heroes' quests, but also deal with Tiffany's difficulties as a young girl maturing into a responsible woman. She is aided in her task by the Nac Mac Feegle, a gang of blue-tattooed, 6-inch tall, hard-drinking, loud-mouthed pictsie creatures also called "The Wee Free Men" who serve as her guardians. She is the protagonist of five novels, The Wee Free Men, A Hat Full of Sky, Wintersmith, I Shall Wear Midnight, and The Shepherd's Crown. Major characters in this series include Miss Tick, a travelling witch who discovers Tiffany; Nac Mac Feegle chieftain Rob Anybody; and the other young witches Annagramma Hawkin and Petulia Gristle. Both Granny Weatherwax and Nanny Ogg also appear in her stories.

Moist von Lipwig 

Moist von Lipwig is a professional criminal and con man to whom Havelock Vetinari gives a "second chance" after staging his execution, recognising the advantages his jack-of-all-trades abilities will give to the development of the city. After putting him in charge of the Ankh-Morpork Post Office in Going Postal, with good results, Vetinari orders him to clear up the city's corrupt financial sector in Making Money. In a third book, Raising Steam, Vetinari directs Lipwig to oversee the development of a railway network for Dick Simnel's newly invented steam locomotive. Other characters in this series include Adora Belle Dearheart, Lipwig's acerbic, chain-smoking love interest; Gladys, a golem who develops a strange crush on Lipwig; Stanley Howler, an obsessive young man who was raised by peas and becomes the Discworld's first stamp collector; and the very old Junior Postman Groat, who never got promoted to Senior Postman because there was never a Postmaster alive long enough to promote him.

Discworld cultures 
Several other books can be grouped together as "Other cultures of Discworld" books. They may contain characters or locations from other arcs, typically not as protagonist or antagonist but as a supporting character or even a throwaway reference. These include Pyramids (Djelibeybi), Small Gods (Omnia), and Monstrous Regiment (Zlobenia and Borogravia).

Characters
Short descriptions of many of the notable characters:

 Ankh-Morpork City Watch members
 Assassins
 Death-associated characters
 Dwarfs
 Gnomes
 History Monks
 Rincewind-associated characters
 Witches
 Wizards 
 Other Discworld characters

Bibliography

Novels

Short stories 
There are also short stories by Pratchett based in the Discworld, including published miscellanea such as the fictional game origins of Thud. All are available in the anthology A Blink of the Screen (2012) as well as in the following locations:

 "Troll Bridge" – in After The King: Stories in honour of J. R. R. Tolkien (1992); reprinted in The Mammoth Book of Comic Fantasy edited by Mike Ashley (1998); available online
 "Theatre of Cruelty" (1993); available online
 "The Sea and Little Fishes" – in Legends (1998), anthology of novellas taking place within popular fantasy cycles edited by Robert Silverberg
 "Death and What Comes Next" (2002); available online
 "A Collegiate Casting-Out of Devilish Devices" (2005) – first published in the 13 May 2005 issue of The Times Higher Education Supplement included in certain editions of Snuff; available online

Seven of the short stories or short writings were also collected in a compilation of the majority of Pratchett's known short work named Once More* With Footnotes (2004).

Additionally, another short story "Turntables of the Night" (1989) is set in England but features Death as a character; it is available online and in both anthologies.

"Mapps" 
Although Terry Pratchett said, "There are no maps. You can't map a sense of humour," there are four "Mapps": The Streets of Ankh-Morpork (1993), The Discworld Mapp (1995), A Tourist Guide to Lancre (1998), and Death's Domain (1999). The first two were drawn by Stephen Player, based on plans by Pratchett and Stephen Briggs, the third is a collaboration between Briggs and Paul Kidby, and the last is by Kidby. All also contain booklets written by Pratchett and Briggs. Terry later collaborated with the Discworld Emporium to produce two much larger works, each with the associated map with the book in a folder, The Compleat Ankh-Morpork City Guide (2012) and The Compleat Discworld Atlas (2015).

Science books 
Pratchett also collaborated with Ian Stewart and Jack Cohen on four books, using the Discworld to illuminate popular science topics. Each book alternates chapters of a Discworld story and notes on real science related to it. The books are:
 The Science of Discworld (1999). .
 The Science of Discworld II: The Globe (2002). .
 The Science of Discworld III: Darwin's Watch (2005). .
 The Science of Discworld IV: Judgement Day (2013). .

Quiz books 
David Langford has compiled two Discworld quiz books:
 The Unseen University Challenge (1996), parodying the TV quiz show University Challenge. . 
 The Wyrdest Link (2002), parodying the TV quiz show The Weakest Link.

Diaries 

Most years see the release of a Discworld Diary and Discworld Calendar, both usually following a particular theme.

The diaries feature background information about their themes. Some topics are later used in the series; the character of Miss Alice Band first appeared in the Assassins' Guild Yearbook, for example.

The Discworld Almanak – The Year of The Prawn has a similar format and general contents to the diaries.

Other books 
Other Discworld publications include:
 The Josh Kirby Discworld Portfolio (1993) A collection of Josh Kirby's artwork, published by Paper Tiger. . 
 The Discworld Companion (1994) An encyclopedia of Discworld information, compiled by Pratchett and Briggs. .
An updated version was released in 2003, titled The New Discworld Companion. .
A further updated version was released in 2012, titled Turtle Recall: The Discworld Companion . . . So Far. .
A new updated version was released in 2021, titled The Ultimate Discworld Companion. .
 The Pratchett Portfolio (1996) A collection of Paul Kidby's artwork, with notes by Pratchett. .
 Nanny Ogg's Cookbook (1999) A collection of Discworld recipes, combined with etiquette, language of flowers etc., written by Pratchett with Stephen Briggs and Tina Hannan. .
 The Art of Discworld (2004) Another collection of Paul Kidby's art. .
 The Discworld Almanak (2004) An almanac for the Discworld year, in the style of the Diaries and the Cookbook, written by Pratchett with Bernard Pearson. .
 Where's My Cow? (2005) A Discworld picture book referenced in Thud! and Wintersmith, written by Pratchett with illustrations by Melvyn Grant. .
 The Unseen University Cut Out Book (2006) Build your own Unseen University, written by Pratchett with Alan Batley and Bernard Pearson, published 1 October 2006. 
 The Wit and Wisdom of Discworld (2007) A collection of quotations from the series. 
 The Folklore of Discworld (2008) A collaboration with British folklorist Jacqueline Simpson, discussing the myths and folklore used in Discworld. 
 The World of Poo (2012) Another in-universe children's book (similar to Where's My Cow), referenced in Snuff. 
 The Compleat Ankh-Morpork: City Guide (2012) The complete guide to the city of Ankh-Morpork. 
 Mrs Bradshaw's Handbook (2014) .

Reading order 
This section discusses chronology and connections between the books. For literal reading order, see bibliography.

The books take place roughly in real time and the characters' ages change to reflect the passing of years. The meetings of various characters from different narrative threads (e.g., Ridcully and Granny Weatherwax in Lords and Ladies, Rincewind and Carrot in The Last Hero) indicate that all the main storylines take place around the same period (end of the Century of the Fruitbat, beginning of the Century of the Anchovy).  The main exception is the stand-alone book Small Gods, which appears to take place at some point earlier than most of the other stories, though even this contains cameo appearances by Death and the Librarian.

Some main characters may make cameo appearances in other books where they are not the primary focus; for example, City Watch members Carrot Ironfoundersson and Angua appear briefly in Going Postal, Making Money, and Unseen Academicals (placing those books after Guards! Guards! and Men at Arms). A number of characters, such as members of staff of Unseen University and Lord Vetinari, appear prominently in many different storylines without having specific storylines of their own. The two most frequently recurring central protagonists, Rincewind and Sam Vimes, are very briefly in a room together in The Last Hero, but they do not interact.

Continuation
After Terry Pratchett was diagnosed with Alzheimer's disease, he said that he would be happy for his daughter Rhianna to continue the series. Pratchett co-founded Narrativia in 2012 along with Rob Wilkins to serve as a production company for adaptations of his works, with Rhianna as a member of its writing team. Rhianna Pratchett said that she would be involved in spin-offs, adaptations and tie-ins, but there would be no more novels.

Adaptations

Audiobooks 
Most of Pratchett's novels have been released as audio cassette and CD audiobooks. 
Unabridged recordings of books 1–23 in the above list, except for books 3, 6 and 9, are read by Nigel Planer. Books 3 and 6 are read by Celia Imrie. Book 9 and most of the books from 24 onward are read by Stephen Briggs. 
Abridged versions are read by Tony Robinson.
Fantastic Audio also recorded two Discworld novels: Thief of Time and Night Watch.
Penguin are releasing a new line of Discworld audiobooks between 2022 and 2023. Voice talent includes Andy Serkis, Peter Serafinowicz and Bill Nighy.

Comics 
The Colour of Magic, The Light Fantastic, Mort,  Guards! Guards!, and Small Gods have been adapted into graphic novels.

Film and television 
Due in part to the complexity of the novels, Discworld has been difficult to adapt to film – Pratchett was fond of an anecdote of a producer attempting to pitch an adaptation of Mort in the early 1990s but was told to "lose the Death angle" by US backers.

Cosgrove Hall series (1996-1997) 
Cosgrove Hall produced several animated adaptations for Channel 4 from 1996 to 1997. All three star Christopher Lee as Death. These were made available on DVD and VHS in the US from Acorn Media.
 Welcome to the Discworld (1996) –  an 8-minute animated television adaptation of a fragment of Reaper Man.
 Soul Music (1997) – also featuring Neil Morrissey and Graham Crowden. The soundtrack to Soul Music was also released on CD, and an accompanying book with stills and script was released. 
 Wyrd Sisters (1997) – starring Annette Crosbie, June Whitfield, Jane Horrocks and Les Dennis.

Sky TV movie trilogy (2006-2010) 
Three television movies were commissioned by Sky One in the late 2000s, each of which were broadcast in two parts. Terry Pratchett cameos as a minor character in all three.
 Terry Pratchett's Hogfather (2006), an adaptation of Hogfather with Ian Richardson as Death, David Jason as Albert and Michelle Dockery as Susan Sto Helit. It was first broadcast in December 2006.
 Terry Pratchett's The Colour of Magic (2008), based on both The Colour of Magic and The Light Fantastic, starring David Jason as Rincewind. Christopher Lee replaces the late Ian Richardson in the role of Death.
 Terry Pratchett's Going Postal (2010), an adaptation of Going Postal starring Richard Coyle, David Suchet, Charles Dance, Claire Foy, Steve Pemberton, Andrew Sachs and Tamsin Greig.

Other adaptations 
 Run Rincewind Run! (2007): A Snowgum Films original story created for Nullus Anxietas. Stars Troy Larkin as Rincewind, and features Terry Pratchett as himself.
 Troll Bridge (2019): A live-action / hand-animated short film by the Australian group Snowgum Films. It premiered at the Flickerfest International Film Festival in January 2019.
 The Watch, a TV series inspired by the Ankh-Morpork City Watch, The Watch has been in development by Terry and then Rhianna Pratchett since 2011. It was greenlit as an eight-episode series by BBC America in October 2018, with Simon Allen as writer and Hilary Salmon, Ben Donald, Rob Wilkins and Phil Collinson as executive producers.
The Amazing Maurice, an animated film adaptation of The Amazing Maurice and His Educated Rodents was in production as of late 2020.

Fan works 
 Mort (2001): A fan movie adaptation of the eponymous novel by Orange Cow Production, 26 minutes.
 Lords and Ladies (2005): A fan movie adaptation of Lords and Ladies by Almost No Budget Films was completed in Germany.

Radio 
There have been several BBC radio adaptations of Discworld stories, including:
 Eric (1990), a 4-part dramatised adaptation began airing on BBC Radio 4 on 6 March 2013.
 Guards! Guards!, six 30-minutes episodes, first broadcast in 1992, narrated by Martin Jarvis
 Mort, four 30-minutes episodes, first broadcast in 2004, starring Anton Lesser and Geoffrey Whitehead
 Night Watch five 30-minutes episodes, first broadcast in 2008, starring Ben Onwukwe and Philip Jackson
 Small Gods, four 30-minutes episodes, first broadcast in 2006, starring Anton Lesser
 Wyrd Sisters, four 30-minutes episodes, first broadcast in 1995, starring Sheila Hancock, Lynda Baron and Deborah Berlin

Stage 
Stephen Briggs published stage adaptations of 18 Discworld novels. Most of them were first produced by the Studio Theatre Club in Abingdon, Oxfordshire. They include adaptations of The Truth, Maskerade, Mort, Wyrd Sisters and Guards! Guards!
Irana Brown directed her adaptation of Lords and Ladies, first performed in 1995 at the Winton Studio Theatre. Her adaptation was published in 2001 by Samuel French, and is still being performed as of 2016.
Allen Stroud directed his adaptation of Reaper Man in 1996, first performed at the Winton Studio Theatre. He retains the script version. This was the first occasion that the character of Death appeared on stage.
A stage version of Eric, adapted by Scott Harrison and Lee Harris, was produced and performed by The Dreaming Theatre Company in July 2003 inside Clifford's Tower, the 700-year-old castle keep in York. It was revived in 2004 in a tour of England, along with Robert Rankin's The Antipope.
Small Gods was adapted for the stage by Ben Saunders and was performed in February 2011 at the Assembly Rooms Theatre, Durham by Ooook! Productions and members of Durham Student Theatre. Ooook! Productions also adapted and staged Terry Pratchett's Night Watch (February 2012), Thief of Time (February 2013; adapted by Tim Foster), Lords and Ladies (February 2014, adapted by Irana Brown), Monstrous Regiment (2015), and Soul Music (February 2016; adapted by Imogen Eddleston).
A stage version of Monstrous Regiment was produced by Lifeline Theatre in Chicago, Illinois in June, July, and August 2014 with an adaptation written by one of Lifeline's ensemble members, Chris Hainsworth.
A stage musical version of Witches Abroad, adapted by Amy Atha-Nicholls, was performed at the 2016 International Discworld Convention.

Merchandise 
Various other types of related merchandise have been produced by cottage industries with an interest in the books, including Stephen Briggs, Bernard Pearson, Bonsai Trading, Paul Kidby and Clarecraft.

Games

 Thud, 2002, by Trevor Truran, publisher The Cunning Artificer. It resembles ancient Norse games such as Hnefatafl, and involves two unequal sides, Trolls and Dwarves with different moves and 'capture' abilities.
 Guards Guards, 2011, by Backspindle Games (Designers: Leonard Boyd & David Brashaw), Published in conjunction with Z-Man Games. This is a 'quest' game where players have to manoeuvre their piece around the board collecting stolen spells to return to the Unseen University, while dealing with various Discworld characters.
 Ankh-Morpork, 2011, by Martin Wallace, published by Treefrog Games. This is a game where each player has a secret victory condition, usually relating to owning buildings in, or controlling, various areas of the city of Ankh-Morpork. During the game, players play cards from their hand to place control elements in the city, remove other players' pieces, or otherwise manipulate the ownership of areas.
 The Witches, 2013, by Martin Wallace, published by Treefrog Games. This is a game aimed at younger players. They must move around the town of Lancre and its surrounds, dealing with 'problems' ranging from a sick pig to an invasion by vampires. It is a semi-cooperative game, in that all players can lose if the game wins, but if they resolve all the problems, then one of them will win.
 Clacks, 2014, by Backspindle Games (Designers: Leonard Boyd & David Brashaw), Published in conjunction with Z-Man Games. In this game players compete to send their 'message' on a clacks board while disrupting their opponents' messages. It resembles the game Amoeba. with its constantly changing board.
The card game Cripple Mr Onion is adapted from the novels.

Musical releases

 Dave Greenslade: Terry Pratchett's From the Discworld (1994; Virgin CDV 2738.7243 8 39512 2 2).
 Keith Hopwood: Soul Music—Terry Pratchett's Discworld, (1998; Proper Music Distribution / Pluto Music TH 030746), soundtrack to the animated adaptation of Soul Music.
 Steeleye Span: Wintersmith, (2013; Park Records), a collection of folk-rock songs based on the book Wintersmith and on other Tiffany Aching stories. There is a spoken contribution by Terry Pratchett.

Role-playing games
Pratchett co-authored with Phil Masters two role-playing game supplements for Discworld, utilising the GURPS system:

 GURPS Discworld (republished as The Discworld Roleplaying Game)
 GURPS Discworld Also

Video games

 The Colour of Magic (ZX Spectrum, Commodore 64)
 Discworld MUD (online multiuser dungeon, 1991), based on the novels
 Discworld (MS-DOS, Macintosh, PlayStation, Saturn)
 Discworld II: Missing Presumed...!? (Discworld II: Mortality Bytes! in North America) (MS-DOS, Windows, PlayStation, Saturn)
 Discworld Noir (Windows, PlayStation)
 Discworld: The Colour of Magic (Mobile phone, 2006)

Twin cities 
Wincanton, in Somerset, UK is twinned with Ankh-Morpork, and the town is the first to name streets after their fictional equivalents.

Critical reception
On 5 November 2019, the BBC News listed The Discworld Series on its list of the 100 most influential novels.

See also

 Craig Shaw Gardner
 Douglas Adams
 Discworld characters
 International Discworld Convention
 Josh Kirby
 The North American Discworld Convention
 Robert Asprin
 Turtles all the way down

References

Literature

Books

Chapters 
 
 
 
 
 
  (см. также пересказ)

Journal articles

External links 

 
 Discworld and Pratchett Wiki (L-Space)
 International Discworld Convention United Kingdom 
 NADWCon North American Discworld Convention
 Nullus Anxietas Australian Discworld Convention
 Discworld Monthly email newsletter and website
 Discworld reading order - guide to the different story arcs
 A Discworld and Terry Pratchett bibliography - all Terry Pratchett's publications in all languages, a chronology, short stories, book reviews, etc.

 
Book series introduced in 1983
British novels adapted into films
British novels adapted into plays
British novels adapted into television shows
Fantasy novel series
High fantasy novels
Metafictional novels
Norse mythology in art and literature
Novels about parallel universes
Novels adapted into comics
Novels adapted into radio programs
Novels adapted into video games
Witchcraft in written fiction
Wizards in fiction